Workers Uniting is a trans-Atlantic trade union created in 2008 by a merger of Unite the Union (better known as Unite) of the United Kingdom and Ireland with the North American United Steelworkers union (USW) based in the United States. Both unions still retain individual branding and leadership.

The merged union has a membership of three million members.

Politics
Workers Uniting opposed the proposed Comprehensive Economic and Trade Agreement between the European Union and Canada.

References

External links
 

General unions
Trade unions established in 2008
Trade unions in Canada
Trade unions in the Republic of Ireland
Trade unions in the United Kingdom
Trade unions in the United States